Eburodacrys moruna is a species of beetle in the family Cerambycidae. It was described by Martins in 1997.

References

Eburodacrys
Beetles described in 1997